Schoolcraft Township may refer to:

Places in the United States:
 Schoolcraft Township, Houghton County, Michigan
 Schoolcraft Township, Kalamazoo County, Michigan
 Schoolcraft Township, Hubbard County, Minnesota